Juliet Jacques (born 3 October 1981) is a British writer, filmmaker and journalist, known for her work on the transgender experience, including her transition as a trans woman, but also for critical writing on football.

She is the founder and presenter of Resonance FM art discussion show Suite (212). She appeared on two episodes of the Media Democracy podcast, talking about how the UK media have treated trans and non-binary people over the last decade.

She was a founding member of The Justin Campaign, created in memory of Justin Fashanu, later renamed to Football vs. Homophobia as the UK's first major campaign against homophobia in football.

Education
Jacques was born in Redhill, Surrey and grew up in nearby Horley. She attended Reigate Grammar School for two years before her parents moved her to a local comprehensive school, followed by the College of Richard Collyer in Horsham, West Sussex, studying History at the University of Manchester and then Literature and Film at the University of Sussex. She completed a PhD in Creative & Critical Writing at the University of Sussex in 2019.

Writing
She began her journalistic career writing about film for Filmwaves, Cineaste and other film publications, while working in a data entry job in Brighton. In 2007, she published a book on English avant-garde author Rayner Heppenstall for Dalkey Archive Press.

Her memoir, entitled Trans, was published by Verso Books in 2015. This book emerged from a series of blog posts called 'A Transgender Journey' that Jacques wrote for the Guardian newspaper in 2010-12, chronicling her gender reassignment on the NHS. The audiobook was narrated by trans actress Rebecca Root.

She also wrote a regular column for the New Statesman between 2011 and 2015 on literature, film, art and football, and has written for Frieze, The London Review of Books and other publications. She contributed a section to Sheila Heti's book Women in Clothes, which was published in 2014.

She published her debut short story collection, Variations, with Influx Press in 2021.

Film
Jacques has made three short films: Approach/Withdraw (2016), co-directed with artist Ker Wallwork; You Will Be Free (2017) about the legacy of the HIV/AIDS crisis, narrated by Anna-Louise Plowman; and Revivification (2018), a documentary about queer and feminist art and politics in Ukraine. She also played herself in Josh Appignanesi's film Female Human Animal (2018).

Awards
She was longlisted for The Orwell Prize in 2011 for 'A Transgender Journey'. In 2012, she was selected as one of The Independent on Sunday Pink List's most influential journalists, and was also included in the list for 2013, 2014 and 2015. In 2016, her book Trans: A Memoir was shortlisted for Polari LGBT Literary Salon's First Book Prize Award. In 2019, Val McDermid chose her as one of ten British LGBT+ writers for the British Council's International Literary Showcase.

Personal life
Jacques also plays football, and won the Shield with the Brighton Bandits at the 2008 IGLFA World Cup.

For several years Jacques worked for the NHS, during the period Andrew Lansley's reforms were implemented. She was made redundant in 2014. She wrote about this period of the NHS in a personal essay for the New Statesman.

References

1981 births
British journalists
Transgender memoirists
British LGBT writers
Living people
People educated at The College of Richard Collyer
People from Horley
People from Redhill, Surrey
Transgender rights activists
Transgender women